Stepnoye is a rural locality (a selo) and the administrative center of Stepnovsky Selsoviet, Rodinsky District, Altai Krai, Russia. The population was 1,401 as of 2013. There are 23 streets.

Geography 
Stepnoye is located 26 km northeast of Rodino (the district's administrative centre) by road. Chernyavka is the nearest rural locality.

References 

Rural localities in Rodinsky District